Nepal Airlines serves 10 international destinations by its 2 Airbus A320 from its hub at Tribhuvan International Airport. Nepal Airlines acquired two Airbus A330-200 jets in 2018. With these 4 jets added to the fleet, the airline plans to expand its international destinations further to the cities like Beijing, Saudi Arabia, Seoul, Sydney and Israel. It is also planning to operate to Europe as soon as it is expected to get removed from the list of air carriers banned in the EU soon.

Destinations

Due to the current pandemic Nepal Airlines operates flights to few destinations. Prior to this, Nepal Airlines offered scheduled flights to the following destinations as of March 2020.

Notes

References

Lists of airline destinations
Nepal transport-related lists
Nepal Airlines